Callon is a neighborhood of the Village of Weston, Marathon County, in the United States. It was an unincorporated community until Weston's incorporation as a village.

History
Callon was named for Patrick Callon, a local landowner.

References

Former populated places in Wisconsin
Populated places in Marathon County, Wisconsin